Syed Ali Akhtar Rizvi (19 September 1948 – 10 February 2002), widely known as Adeeb-e-Asr and  Allamah Shaoor, was an Indian Twelver Shī'ah scholar, public speaker, translator, and historian as well as an author and poet. He authored and translated many Islamic books and also wrote many articles and poems.

He received the title "Adeeb-e-Asr" ("Writer of the era") from Grand Ayatollah Naser Makarem Shirazi during the tour of Iran in 1990.

Biography

Early life and education

Syed Ali Akhtar Rizvi was born at Gopalpur, Siwan district, Bihar state, India on 19 September 1948. His father was Syed Mazhar Hussain Rizvi. At the age of three, his father died and he was brought up by his mother. It was his mother's ambitions that lead him towards Islamic studies so he joined Jamia Nazmia and stayed in Madrasatul Waizeen.  But due to financial problems he moved to Lucknow Shia Orphanage to fulfil his ambition to become an Islamic scholar. As soon as financial conditions improved he moved to Madrasatul Waizeen.

He returned home after completing his last exam Mumtaz-ul-Afazil at Jamia Nazmia.

Death and funeral

Syed Ali Akhtar Rizvi died on 10 February 2002. His funeral was attended by many scholars and preachers and was followed by a crowd at Gopalpur, Siwan district, Bihar.

Bibliography

As translator

As author

As poet

Articles
His articles was greatly influenced by Islamic Literature and enlighten many historic facts of Islam. His articles mainly laid emphasis on Qur'an, wilayat, tragedy of Karbala, and usool-e-deen. Some of his articles are listed below:
wilayet-e-Ali(a.s) Qur'an ki raushni me
Kalma-e-Innama Qur'an Ki Raushn Me
Eid-e-Ghadir
wilayat-e-Ali(a.s) ki Ma'wun Ahadees
Ghadir aur Qur'an
Ghadeer: Daaman ki Dhajjiyan
Wilayat ke dunyawi wa Aakhari fawayed per Ajmali Nazar
Eid per Sahaba ki hasdana nazar
Ahmiyat Ghadir: Masumeen(a.s) ki nazar me
Shuja'at Hazrat Zahra(s.a)
Imam Hussain(a.s) paikar-e-Muhabbat
Imam Hussain(a.s) per Girya
Zikr-e-Khuda aur Karbala
Aadi Tariqa shahadat kyu
Ghulamo ke Hukhuq aur Karbala
Ek maqbool Nauha
janabe Qasim(a.s) ki Shahadat

Beside Islamic article, he had also written articles on Urdu Literature. This type of articles were related to different aspect of life and way of living it. The articles also describe the way of spreading Love, affection and generosity among mankind.

See also
 List of Shi'a Muslim scholars of Islam
 Shi'a clergy
 Al-Ghadir

References

External links
Biography 
List of Syed Ali Akhtar Rizvi Books 
Article of Syed Ali Akhtar Rizvi
Syed Ali Akhtar Rizvi pics

1948 births
2002 deaths
Twelvers
Indian Islamic religious leaders
Indian Shia Muslims
Shia scholars of Islam
20th-century Muslim scholars of Islam
20th-century Indian philosophers
Islamic philosophers
People from Siwan district
Urdu-language poets
20th-century poets
Indian Muslim scholars of Islam